Bershawn D. Jackson (born May 8, 1983) is an American athlete, who mainly competes in the 400 m hurdles, but also is a 400 m runner.

At the 2008 Summer Olympics, Bershawn "Batman" Jackson won a bronze medal in the 400 m hurdles. He also has three medals (two gold, one bronze) at the World Championships and one gold medal at the World Indoor Championships.

Career
Jackson first came to prominence while running for Miami Central High School, where he set the still standing FHSAA (Florida High School) record in the 300 meter hurdles at 36.01 in 2002. He then continued to run at the college level at Saint Augustine's University and set a Division II National Championship Record of 48.50 in the 400 m hurdles in 2004.

Personal bests

References

External links

 
 

1983 births
Living people
African-American male track and field athletes
American male hurdlers
American male sprinters
Athletes (track and field) at the 2008 Summer Olympics
Olympic bronze medalists for the United States in track and field
World Athletics Championships medalists
Medalists at the 2008 Summer Olympics
World Athletics Championships athletes for the United States
Track and field athletes from Miami
Diamond League winners
USA Outdoor Track and Field Championships winners
USA Indoor Track and Field Championships winners
World Athletics Indoor Championships winners
IAAF Continental Cup winners
World Athletics Championships winners
21st-century African-American sportspeople
20th-century African-American people